Subconscious Cruelty is a 2000 Canadian independent experimental anthology horror film written and directed by Karim Hussain and produced by Mitch Davis. It was filmed over a long period of time, from February 1994 to December 1999, and debuted at the Festival de Cine de Sitges in Sitges, Spain, on October 12, 2000. The film went on to screen at several other festivals, including the Stockholm International Film Festival and Amsterdam Fantastic Film Festival before being released on DVD on April 18, 2005. The film was first released in Canada on Friday, April 13, 2001. It screened at Cinema Du Parc in Montreal, Quebec, Canada for two weeks from April 13 to the 28th of 2001. It was again screened at the same theater for a single weekend in November 2001, and one last time in June 2003. It has not been screened publicly in Canada since then.

Plot 
The film is divided into four anthological short stories without any connection to each other:

Ovarian Eyeball

It begins with a small scene disconnected from the rest of the story, where an eye is taken from inside a woman's belly.

Human Larvae

The narrator reveals himself to be obsessed with his sister who has just become pregnant by her husband, watching the couple have sex while masturbating hidden behind a door. He watches her do a fellatio while watching in awe. He says he feels a strong attraction to her and that semen is a kind of gift of creation while female menstruation is a bad joke. The narrator begins to show a more pronounced psychotic streak when he says that his sister's pregnancy started to make him less excited about her and that he decided to do the most horrible thing in man: kill during the creation process.

During her birth, her brother helps her to have her child. As soon as the child is born, he slits its throat with a knife and its umbilical cord, dumping the blood on her face to her horror. The sister ends up bleeding to death while the brother decides to make an altar of the baby in the sink, revealing that he wrapped him in a cloth and left him to rot there. He later reveals that his sister's body has remained in place and that he sometimes sleeps next to her. The tale ends with the narrator saying that he even tried to perform necrophilia on the woman, but as she was cold and without much life, he preferred to stop for his displeasure.

Rebirth

Some naked people start rubbing and rolling on the sand of a beach as if they were having sex with the earth. Blood starts pouring out of the sand as they start having an orgy with nature.

Right Brain/ Martyrdom

The third tale tells the story of an unknown man driven by faith who is obsessed with masturbation and watching pornographic videos. He has some nightmares, among which are several hooks stuck in his penis as they are pulled. A female hand appears and masturbates him before he wakes up. The man takes a knife and starts masturbating with it, skinning his penis. He melts a crucifix and pours its contents into a syringe, injecting it into his forehead and presumably dying.

Elsewhere in this town, a man similar to Jesus is dragged into some sort of church and is devoured by three naked women. They force him to eat his own flesh while they do canibalism. The trio pour wine over him alluding to the body of Christ before they start having sex with his guts, where he is already dead. The tale ends with the man being impaled through the anus by a stick, leaving the screen black afterwards.

Cast

Ovarian Eyeball
 Sophie Lauzière as Woman On Slab
 Anne-Marie Belley as Hand

Human Larvae
 Brea Asher as Sister
 Ivaylo Founev as Brother
 Eric Levasseur as Lover
 Janis Higgins as Girl in Photo

Rebirth
 Nadia Simaani as Female Performer #1
 Anna Berlyn as Female Performer #2
 Nancy Simard as Female Performer #3
 Sean Spuruey as Male Performer #1
 Scott Noonan as Male Performer #2
 Mitch Davis as Male Performer #3

Right Brain/Martyrdom
 Christopher Piggins as Businessman/Doppelganger
 Annette Pankrac as Secretary
 Eric Pettigrew as Martyr/Jesus Christ
 Martine Viale as Attacker/Female Demon

Production

Development
Hussain began filming Subconscious Cruelty at the age of 19 after connecting with 22-year-old Davis, a producer whom Hussain knew to believe in the project. Hussain felt that the subculture of the mid-1990s, a time when heroin usage was prevalent and nihilism was gaining acceptance in the art world, would be accepting of his film. Influences for the film include works by Alexandro Jodorowsky, Luis Buñuel, Dušan Makavejev, David Lynch, David Cronenberg and others.

The filmmaking process was beset by various problems, including the disappearance of the film negative in a financial dispute, forcing Hussain to hand-cut the positive of the film without knowing if he would ever re-gain the negative. Another setback occurred when Hussain was stopped at the Canada–United States border after a business trip to the United States. Canadian customs officials inspected the film, and, appalled by its content, confiscated it as illegally obscene material. As a result, the original stock had to be hidden for a long period of time.

Release

Critical reception 
Subconscious Cruelty received mixed reviews by mostly non-mainstream critics. Since the film was not released in the US market, traditional critics of English-language films did not see or comment on it. Known establishments such as Fangoria considered it "a film suffused with images that incite thoughts, many of which would be considered unhealthy in any artistic medium".
Jon Condit of Dread Central noted that, although the film was beautifully shot, scored, and featured unsettling imagery, he felt that the film pushed the boundaries of what he called "visual metaphor" to the point where he felt it was too extreme.

References

External links 
 
 
 

2000 films
2000 horror films
Incest in film
Canadian avant-garde and experimental films
Canadian horror anthology films
Canadian independent films
English-language Canadian films
2000s avant-garde and experimental films
Films directed by Karim Hussain
2000s English-language films
2000s Canadian films